Oxford Historic District is a national historic district located in Oxford, Chester County, Pennsylvania. It encompasses 517 contributing buildings, 1 contributing sites, and 1 contributing structure in the central business district and surrounding residential areas of Oxford. They are mostly brick residential and commercial structures built between 1870 and 1910 and in a variety of popular architectural styles including Queen Anne and Italianate.  Notable non-residential buildings include the Oxford Hall, Octoraro Hotel, Oxford Station (Borough Hall), Dickey Building, Masonic Building, Fulton Bank Building (1925), Gibson's Store (c. 1832), Orthodox Friends Meeting House, Methodist Church (1885), United Presbyterian Church (1893), and the Oxford Grain & Hay Company granary (1880).  The Oxford Hotel is located in the district and listed separately.

It was added to the National Register of Historic Places in 2007.

References

Historic districts on the National Register of Historic Places in Pennsylvania
Italianate architecture in Pennsylvania
Queen Anne architecture in Pennsylvania
Historic districts in Chester County, Pennsylvania
National Register of Historic Places in Chester County, Pennsylvania